The 1966–67 NBA season was the Hawks' 18th season in the NBA as well as the 12th and penultimate season in St. Louis.

Regular season

Season standings

x – clinched playoff spot

Record vs. opponents

Game log

Playoffs

|- align="center" bgcolor="#ccffcc"
| 1
| March 21
| Chicago
| W 114–100
| Lou Hudson (26)
| Bridges, Silas (14)
| Lenny Wilkens (6)
| Kiel Auditorium4,704
| 1–0
|- align="center" bgcolor="#ccffcc"
| 2
| March 23
| @ Chicago
| W 113–107
| Lou Hudson (29)
| Bill Bridges (12)
| Richie Guerin (6)
| International Amphitheatre3,739
| 2–0
|- align="center" bgcolor="#ccffcc"
| 3
| March 25
| Chicago
| W 119–106
| Lenny Wilkens (27)
| Bill Bridges (28)
| Lenny Wilkens (8)
| Kiel Auditorium7,018
| 3–0
|-

|- align="center" bgcolor="#ffcccc"
| 1
| March 30
| @ San Francisco
| L 115–117
| Lou Hudson (36)
| Bill Bridges (21)
| Lenny Wilkens (6)
| Cow Palace7,813
| 0–1
|- align="center" bgcolor="#ffcccc"
| 2
| April 1
| @ San Francisco
| L 136–143
| Bill Bridges (26)
| Bill Bridges (22)
| Lenny Wilkens (9)
| Cow Palace12,337
| 0–2
|- align="center" bgcolor="#ccffcc"
| 3
| April 5
| San Francisco
| W 115–109
| Bill Bridges (25)
| Bill Bridges (32)
| Lenny Wilkens (7)
| Kiel Auditorium8,042
| 1–2
|- align="center" bgcolor="#ccffcc"
| 4
| April 8
| San Francisco
| W 109–104
| Joe Caldwell (24)
| Bill Bridges (17)
| Lenny Wilkens (11)
| Kiel Auditorium10,016
| 2–2
|- align="center" bgcolor="#ffcccc"
| 5
| April 10
| @ San Francisco
| L 102–123
| Richie Guerin (19)
| Bill Bridges (17)
| Lenny Wilkens (7)
| Cow Palace10,311
| 2–3
|- align="center" bgcolor="#ffcccc"
| 6
| April 12
| San Francisco
| L 107–112
| Zelmo Beaty (28)
| Zelmo Beaty (16)
| Lenny Wilkens (6)
| Kiel Auditorium8,004
| 2–4
|-

References

Atlanta Hawks seasons
St. Louis
St. Louis Hawks
St. Louis Hawks